The glaucous tanager (Thraupis glaucocolpa) is a species of bird in the family Thraupidae.  The term glaucous describes its colouration.  It is found in Colombia and Venezuela.  Its natural habitats are subtropical or tropical moist lowland forests and heavily degraded former forest.

References

glaucous tanager
Birds of Colombia
Birds of Venezuela
glaucous tanager
Taxonomy articles created by Polbot
Taxobox binomials not recognized by IUCN